Modesto Madariaga (12 January 1904, in Corral de Almaguer, Spain - 4 June 1974, in Buenos Aires, Argentina) was a Spanish aviation mechanic.

Flight

In 1933, he was the mechanic accompanying Mariano Barberán and Lieutenant Joaquín Collar Serra when they flew the Cuatro Vientos, a Br.19 TF Super Bidon built specially for this flight, from Spain to Cuba. The flight, which took 39 hours and 55 minutes, departed Seville on at 4:40 on 10 June 1933 and arrived in Camagüey at 20:45 (local time) on 11 June 1933, after a flight of 7320 km.

Later life
Madariaga did not accompany Barberán and Collar Serra in the second flight of the Cuatro Vientos en route to Mexico City on 20 June 1933, during which the aircraft and its occupants disappeared near Villahermosa. No trace of the plane or of its two occupants was subsequently found. 

He died in Buenos Aires, Argentina on 4 June 1974, aged 70.

References

1904 births
1974 deaths
Spanish aviators